Courtland Cushing Matson (April 25, 1841 – September 4, 1915) was an American lawyer and Civil War veteran who served four terms as a U.S. Representative from Indiana from 1881 to 1889.

Early life
Courtland Cushing Matson was born on April 25, 1841, in Brookville, Indiana. Matson graduated from Indiana Asbury University (now De Pauw University) in 1862. He later studied law. He was admitted to the bar.

Career
During the Civil War, Matson enlisted as a private in the Sixteenth Regiment, Indiana Volunteers. After one year's service entered the Sixth Regiment, Indiana Volunteer Cavalry (Seventy-first Volunteers), and served until October 1865, and was subsequently promoted to the rank of colonel.

After the war, Matson studied law and commenced practice in Greencastle, Indiana. He was three times elected prosecuting attorney of Putnam County, Indiana. He served as chairman of the Democratic State central committee in 1878.

Congress
Matson was elected as a Democrat to the Forty-seventh and to the three succeeding Congresses (March 4, 1881 – March 3, 1889). He served as chairman of the Committee on Invalid Pensions (Forty-eighth through Fiftieth Congresses). He was not a candidate for renomination. He was an unsuccessful Democratic candidate for Governor of Indiana in 1888.

Later career
He resumed the practice of law in Greencastle, Indiana. He served as member of the board of tax commissioners 1909–1913.

Personal life
Matson died on September 4, 1915, in Chicago, Illinois. He was interred in Forest Hill Cemetery in Greencastle.

References

1841 births
1915 deaths
DePauw University alumni
People from Brookville, Indiana
Union Army colonels
People of Indiana in the American Civil War
Democratic Party members of the United States House of Representatives from Indiana
19th-century American politicians